Heterodeltis mentella is a moth in the family Lecithoceridae. It was described by Cajetan Felder, Rudolf Felder and Alois Friedrich Rogenhofer in 1875.

References

Moths described in 1875
Lecithocerinae